Raymond John "Ray" Soff (born October 31, 1958) is an American former professional baseball pitcher. In 1976 he helped lead Blissfield High School to the State Championship.

References

External links

1958 births
Living people
Arkansas Travelers players
American expatriate baseball players in Canada
Baseball players from Michigan
Central Michigan Chippewas baseball players
Edmonton Trappers players
Geneva Cubs players
Louisville Redbirds players
Major League Baseball pitchers
Midland Cubs players
People from Adrian, Michigan
Portland Beavers players
Quad Cities Cubs players
Salinas Spurs players
St. Louis Cardinals players
Tidewater Tides players